HMS Escort was an E-class destroyer built for the Royal Navy in the early 1930s. Although assigned to the Home Fleet upon completion, the ship was attached to the Mediterranean Fleet in 1935–36, during the Abyssinia Crisis. During the Spanish Civil War of 1936–1939, she spent considerable time in Spanish waters, enforcing the arms blockade imposed by Britain and France on both sides of the conflict. Escort was assigned to convoy escort and anti-submarine patrol duties in the Western Approaches, when World War II began in September 1939. During the Norwegian Campaign, the ship escorted ships of the Home Fleet, although she did tow her sister  after the latter ship had been badly damaged by German air attack. Escort was assigned to Force H in late June, and participated in the Attack on Mers-el-Kébir in early July. She was torpedoed  a few days later by an Italian submarine, but was towed for three days towards Gibraltar before she foundered.

Description
The E-class ships were slightly improved versions of the preceding D class. They were powered by two Parsons geared steam turbines, each driving one propeller shaft, using steam provided by three Admiralty three-drum boilers. The ships' complement was 145 officers and ratings.

The ships mounted four 45-calibre 4.7-inch (120 mm) Mark IX guns in single mounts. For anti-aircraft (AA) defence, they had two quadruple Mark I mounts for the 0.5 inch Vickers Mark III machine gun. The E class was fitted with two above-water quadruple torpedo tube mounts for  torpedoes. One depth charge rail and two throwers were fitted; 20 depth charges were originally carried, but this increased to 35 shortly after the war began.

Service
Escort was ordered from Scotts Shipbuilding and Engineering Company, at Greenock, Scotland on 1 November 1932, under the 1931 Construction Programme. She was laid down on 30 March 1933, and launched on 29 March 1934. She was commissioned on 30 October 1934, at a total cost of £249,587, excluding government-furnished equipment like the armament. Upon commissioning the ship was assigned to the 5th Destroyer Flotilla of the Home Fleet, aside from a brief deployment in the West Indies between January and March 1935. Afterwards, she was refitted in Sheerness from 27 March to 30 April. Escort was attached to the Mediterranean Fleet from September 1935 to March 1936, during the Abyssinian Crisis. She struck a lock while at Sheerness and required seven weeks of repairs that were not completed until 5 September. The ship patrolled Spanish waters during the Spanish Civil War, enforcing the edicts of the Non-Intervention Committee until 24 March 1939, when she returned to the United Kingdom. Escort became tender to the light cruiser  of the Reserve Fleet upon her return, and was not recommissioned until 2 August, when she was assigned to the 12th Destroyer Flotilla.

The ship was assigned to convoy escort and anti-submarine duties in the Western Approaches Command. She was transferred to Rosyth in December, for similar duties in the North Sea. Escort was refitted at Falmouth between 10 January and 12 February 1940, and resumed her duties afterwards.

When the Norwegian Campaign began in early April, Escort was transferred to the Home Fleet, and was screening the capital ships when they sortied into the North Sea looking for the German ship on 9 April. After her sister Eclipse was damaged by air attack on 11 April, Escort towed her to Sullom Voe. She accompanied Glorious when that ship returned to Scapa Flow to refuel and replenish her aircraft on 27 April. The ship was slightly damaged in a collision with the Polish ocean liner Chrobry on 11 May. She arrived on 2 July, and joined Force H in attacking ships of the French Navy at Mers-el-Kébir the next day. Later that morning she foundered.

Notes

References
 
 
 
 

 

E and F-class destroyers of the Royal Navy
Ships built on the River Clyde
1934 ships
World War II destroyers of the United Kingdom
Ships sunk by Italian submarines
World War II shipwrecks in the Mediterranean Sea
Maritime incidents in July 1940